Zhai Wanming (born August 1963) is a Chinese scientist who is a professor at Southwest Jiaotong University. He was a delegate to the 19th National Congress of the Communist Party of China.

Biography
Zhai was born into a family of farming background in Jingjiang, Jiangsu, in August 1963. He was the second of three children. After the resumption of college entrance examination, he was admitted to Southwest Jiaotong University, where he studied vehicle heat transfer under Yu Chengshun (. After university, he stayed at the university, he was promoted to associate professor in 1991 and to full professor in 1994. In July 1994 he became director of its Train and Route Research Institute.

Honours and awards
 1995 National Science Fund for Distinguished Young Scholars
 December 2011 Member of the Chinese Academy of Sciences (CAS)
 9 February 2021 Foreign associates of the National Academy of Engineering for contributions to the design and operation of high-speed rail transportation networks.

References

1963 births
Living people
People from Jingjiang
Scientists from Jiangsu
Southwest Jiaotong University alumni
Academic staff of the Southwest Jiaotong University
Members of the Chinese Academy of Sciences
Foreign associates of the National Academy of Engineering